The Pacific Naval Force is the Mexican Navy's presence in the Pacific Ocean. Its headquarters is in Manzanillo, Colima. The Pacific Naval Force was created in the same date as its Gulf of Mexico and Caribbean Sea counterpart on February 11, 1972. The Surface ships are the main components of  The Naval Force and is the means to secure and to operate sea control in strategic areas. Main objectives of the Naval force is to Defend the sovereignty and integrity of  Mexico from sea, protect vital naval installations, protect human life and maintain marine traffic and maintain the rule of law in national waters.

Organization
The Naval Force is divided into 4 Naval Regions, 10 Naval Zones, and 6 Naval Sectors:
Second Naval Region Northern Pacific (RN-2) – Ensenada, Baja California
 Naval sector – Puerto Cortés, Baja California Sur
Fourth Naval Region Gulf of California (RN-4) – Guaymas, Sonora
Second Naval Zone (ZN-2) – La Paz, Baja California Sur
Naval Sector – Santa Rosalía, Baja California Sur
Naval Sector – Cabo San Lucas, Baja California Sur
Fourth Naval Zone (ZN-4) – Mazatlán, Sinaloa
Naval Sector – Puerto Peñasco, Sonora
Naval Sector – San Felipe, Baja California
Naval Sector – Topolobampo, Sinaloa
 Sixth Naval Region Center Pacific (RN-6) – Manzanillo, Colima
Sixth Naval Zone (ZN-6) – San Blas, Nayarit
Naval Sector – Isla Socorro
Eight Naval Zone (ZN-8) – Puerto Vallarta, Jalisco
Tenth Naval Zone (ZN-10) – Lázaro Cárdenas, Michoacán
Eight Naval Region South Pacific (RN-8) – Acapulco, Guerrero
Naval Sector Ixtapa – Zihuatanejo, Guerrero
Twelfth Naval Zone (ZN-12) – Salina Cruz, Oaxaca
Naval Sector – Huatulco, Oaxaca
 Fourteenth Naval Zone (ZN-14) – Puerto Chiapas, Chiapas

Naval ship units

Destroyer Flotilla
 
  (1973 – 2015)
 
  (1982 – 2014)
 Bravo class
 ARM Bravo (F-201) (1993 – 2017)
ARM Galeana (F-202) (1993 – 2017)

Auxiliary Ship Flotilla
 Panuco class
 ARM Manzanillo (A-402) (1971 – 2011)
 Papaloapan class
 ARM Papaloapan (A-411) (2001 – present)
 ARM Usumacinta (A-412) (2001 – present)

Ship Embarked Helicopter Squadron
AS555 AF Fennec

Amphibious Reaction Force

Naval Infantry Units
Command and General Staff
2nd Marine Amphibious Infantry Battalion
1st Amphibious Assault Vehicle Company
4th Marine Amphibious Infantry Battalion
2nd Amphibious Assault Vehicle Company
2nd Amphibious Comando Battalion
3rd Amphibious Assault Vehicle Company
Amphibious Vehicle Reconnaissance Company
2nd Support Battalion

Naval Air Squadron
 Antonov An-32

Special Forces Group
Special Forces Unit
Command and Command Group
Support Group
Transport Unit
Mil Mi-8
Patrol Interceptor Group

See also
Mexican Navy
Gulf and Caribbean Sea Naval Force
Mexican Naval Aviation

External links
  Pacific Naval Force

Military units and formations of Mexico
Mexican Navy
Military units and formations established in 1972